Zinc finger protein SNAI1 (sometimes referred to as Snail) is a protein that in humans is encoded by the SNAI1 gene. Snail is a family of transcription factors that promote the repression of the adhesion molecule E-cadherin to regulate epithelial to mesenchymal transition (EMT) during embryonic development. G

Function 

The Drosophila embryonic protein SNAI1, commonly known as Snail, is a zinc finger transcriptional repressor which downregulates the expression of ectodermal genes within the mesoderm. The nuclear protein encoded by this gene is structurally similar to the Drosophila Snail protein, and is also thought to be critical for mesoderm formation in the developing embryo. At least two variants of a similar processed pseudogene have been found on chromosome 2. SNAI1 zinc-fingers (ZF) binds to E-box, an E-cadherin promoter region, and represses the expression of the adhesion molecule, which induces the tightly bound epithelial cells to break loose from each other and migrate into the developing embryo to become mesenchymal cells. This process allows for the formation of the mesodermal layer in the developing embryo. Though SNAI1 is shown to repress expression of E-cadherin in epithelial cells, studies have shown homozygous mutant embryos are still able to form a mesodermal layer. However, the mesodermal layer present shows characteristics of epithelial cells and not mesenchymal cells (the mutant mesoderm cells exhibited a polarized state). Other studies show that mutation of specific ZFs contribute to a decrease in SNAI1 E-cadherin repression.

SNAI1 and other epithelial-mesenchymal transition (EMT) genes are regulated by several genes and molecules including Wnt and prostaglandins. Wnt3a is a master regulator of paraxial presomatic mesoderm cells (PSM) which differentiate into the musculoskeleton of the trunk and tail. Other genes, most of which act downstream of Wnt include Msx1, Pax3, and Mesogenin 1 (Msgn1). Msgn1 activates SNAI1 by binding to its enhancer and activating SNAI1 to induce EMT. MSGN1 also regulates many of the same genes as SNAI1 to ensure EMT activation, granting the system redundancy. This suggests that Msgn1 and SNAI1 act together through a feed forward mechanism. When Msgn1 is deleted, the mesodermal progenitors do not move from the primitive streak (PS) but still show mesenchymal morphology. This suggests that the Msgn1/SNAI1 axis mostly functions to drive cell movement. Prostaglandin E2 (PE2), an important hormone in homeostasis and maintaining normal fertility and pregnancy, stabilizes SNAI1 post-transcriptionally and, therefore, also plays a role in embryogenesis. When the prostaglandin signaling pathway is compromised, SNAI1 transcriptional repressor activity decreases, increasing E-cadherin protein levels during gastrulation. However, this does not prevent gastrulation from occurring.

Clinical significance 

Snail gene may show a role in recurrence of breast cancer by downregulating E-cadherin and inducing an epithelial to mesenchymal transition. The process of EMT is also noted as an important and noteworthy process in tumor growth, through the invasion and metastasis of tumor cells due to repression of E-cadherin adhesion molecules. Through knockout models, one study has shown the importance of SNAI1 in the growth of breast cancer cells. Knockout models showed significant reduction in cancer invasiveness and therefore can be used as a therapeutic measure for the treatment of breast cancer before chemotherapy treatment.

Interactions 

SNAI1 has been shown to interact with CTDSPL, CTDSP1 and CTDSP2. Snail1 affects cell polarity by interacting with members of the Crumbs family including CRUMBS3 and CRB1.

References

Further reading